Kalamunda National Park is a national park in Western Australia,  east of Perth, near the town of Kalamunda.

Description
The park is composed of typical Darling Scarp woodland including species of marri, jarrah and wandoo with a diverse understorey including a range of wildflowers.

Piesse Brook flows through the park before joining the Helena River, making the park and important catchment area for both the Helena and the Swan Rivers.

No fees apply to enter the park but facilities exist within the park for visitors apart from several walk trails including the northern end of the Bibbulmun Track.

Important Bird Area
The park lies within the Mundaring-Kalamunda Important Bird Area, so identified by BirdLife International because of its importance as a non-breeding season roost site and foraging base  for long-billed black cockatoos.

See also
 Protected areas of Western Australia

References 

National parks of Western Australia
Protected areas established in 1964
Important Bird Areas of Western Australia
Kalamunda, Western Australia
Jarrah Forest